Barwon is an electoral district of the Legislative Assembly in the Australian state of New South Wales. It is represented by Roy Butler a former the Shooters Fishers and Farmers Party MP, but now an Independent MP.

Covering roughly 44% of the land mass of New South Wales, Barwon is by far the state's largest electoral district. It includes the local government areas of Bourke Shire, Brewarrina Shire, Narrabri Shire, Walgett Shire, Warrumbungle Shire, Coonamble Shire, Gilgandra Shire, Warren Shire, Bogan Shire, Lachlan Shire, Cobar Shire, Central Darling Shire, the City of Broken Hill as well as the large Unincorporated Far West Region surrounding Broken Hill.

History
Barwon was originally created in 1894, when it along with Moree, replaced Gwydir.  In 1904, with the downsizing of the Legislative Assembly after Federation, Gwydir was recreated and Moree and Barwon were abolished.  In 1927, with the breakup of the three-member Electoral district of Namoi, it was recreated.

Originally a marginal seat that traded hands between the Labor Party and the conservative parties, it was considered a safe seat for the National Party who held it without interruption from 1950 until 2019, when it was won by the Shooters, Fishers and Farmers Party.

Members for Barwon

Election results

References

Electoral districts of New South Wales
1894 establishments in Australia
Constituencies established in 1894
1904 disestablishments in Australia
Constituencies disestablished in 1904
1927 establishments in Australia
Constituencies established in 1927
North West Slopes